Gabe Dixon (born December 7, 1977) is an American musician. Dixon began his career in the Nashville-based country band Six Shooter. Between 1998 and 2010, he was the lead singer of The Gabe Dixon Band. Since the band's break-up, Dixon has worked as a solo artist. He has released two studio albums, One Spark (2011) and Turns to Gold (2016), and one live album, Live In Boston (2017). He is also the founder of the label Rolling Ball Records. 

As of 2019, Dixon is on tour with the Tedeschi Trucks Band. His original tour with the band was scheduled into 2020, but it was postponed until 2021 due to the COVID-19 pandemic. Dixon has since released three singles across 2020: "Smoke Clears", "Bend The Curve" and "New Year Just With You," and he published his latest album, "Lay It On Me," in 2021.

Career

Beginnings and The Gabe Dixon Band

Gabe Dixon started early studying piano influenced by Billy Joel and Elton John. While studying at University of Miami, in 1998, he formed the four-piece band The Gabe Dixon Band alongside drummer Jano Rix, bassist Winston Harrison and alto saxophonist Chandler Webber. He worked with producer/engineer Eddie Kramer to independently release their debut album, More Than It Would Seem. Upon graduation from the University of Miami, the band relocated to New York City and were signed to Reprise by David Kahne.

Dixon played keyboards and sang backing vocals on Paul McCartney's 2001 album, Driving Rain. Dixon also performed live with McCartney at the Concert For New York City, a September 11 fundraiser. McCartney offered Dixon the opportunity to join his world tour, but Dixon declined citing his plans for a new album. Dixon played keyboards and kalimba with Loggins & Messina on their Live: Sittin' In Again at the Santa Barbara Bowl concert which was recorded and released on CD and DVD in 2005.

The band released their major label debut, On a Rolling Ball in 2002. Three years later, they released the Live at World Cafe EP, which featured the song "All Will Be Well" which was featured in promos for the NBC show Conviction.

Following the Live at World Cafe EP, the band signed with Fantasy Records and released The Gabe Dixon Band in August 2008. The band toured the United States in 2008. "Find My Way" was the opening track to the film The Proposal in 2009. The band discontinued in 2010 with Gabe Dixon deciding to go solo.

Solo career 
Dixon released his first solo album, One Spark, on August 23, 2011 on Concord Bicycle Music. The album is produced by Marshall Altman and features a duet with Alison Krauss entitled "Even the Rain." Madi Diaz and James Walsh also lend their voices to the songs "Burn for You" and "I Can See You Shine," respectively. He also founded his own record label, Rolling Ball Records.

On April 8, 2016, Dixon released his second solo album, Turns to Gold, on his own label, Rolling Ball Records. The album is produced by Paul Moak and features a duet with Natalie Prass entitled "The Way To Love Me."

In the past, Gabe would play primarily grand piano. However, on "Turns to Gold," he performed all but one song on an upright piano. This choice conveyed a different energy. He and the musicians, including Jano Rix on drums (The Gabe Dixon Band, The Wood Brothers), Viktor Krauss on bass (Lyle Lovett), and Kris Donegan on guitar (Cam), cut everything to analog tape with no click track. The album also features vocal performances by Jason Eskridge, Garrison Starr and Boots Ottestad. Mastering was done by Brad Blackwood at Euphonics Mastering.

Appearances and popular culture 
Gabe's song, "Find My Way," was the opening track to the film The Proposal, starring Sandra Bullock and Ryan Reynolds. "All Will Be Well" was featured in the fourth season of the television show Parks and Recreation. And "Till You're Gone" was used in Bose store displays.

Gabe has performed twice on Jimmy Kimmel Live!, as well as The Late Late Show with Craig Ferguson.

Throughout his career, many other notable artists have taken note of and supported Gabe's talent. He's held side gigs as the keyboardist and vocalist for Paul McCartney, Alison Krauss & Union Station, O.A.R. and Supertramp.

Discography
Solo albums
2011: One Spark (produced by Marshall Altman, released on Concord Bicycle Music
2016: Turns to Gold (produced by Paul Moak, released by Rolling Ball Records)
2017: Live in Boston (released by BirnCORE)
2021: Lay It On Me

As part of The Gabe Dixon Band
1999: More Than It Would Seem 
2002: On a Rolling Ball
2005: Live at World Cafe
2008: The Gabe Dixon Band

As part of Tedeschi Trucks Band
2022: I Am the Moon

References

External links
 Gabe Dixon Band
 Gabe Dixon Band collection at the Internet Archive's live music archive

Living people
Year of birth missing (living people)
American rock pianists
Supertramp members
American male pianists
21st-century American pianists
21st-century American male musicians